The central Asiatic frog (Rana asiatica), or Asian frog, is a species of true frog, found in China, Kazakhstan, and Kyrgyzstan.
Its natural habitats are temperate forests, temperate shrubland, temperate grassland, rivers, intermittent rivers, swamps, freshwater lakes, intermittent freshwater lakes, freshwater marshes, intermittent freshwater marshes, freshwater springs, inland deltas, arable land, pastureland, rural gardens, urban areas, water storage areas, ponds, aquaculture ponds, and irrigated land.
It is not considered threatened by the IUCN.

References

Rana (genus)
Frogs of Asia
Least concern biota of Asia
Taxonomy articles created by Polbot
Amphibians described in 1898